Daniel Brown MBE (born 29 November 1982) is a retired British para rower who competed at international level events. He is a Paralympic champion, a triple World champion and a double World Rowing Cup champion in the mixed coxed four with Grace Clough, Pam Relph, James Fox and Oliver James.

Brown was a keen football and rugby league player when he was in his teenage years and played for Wokingham. He was involved in a car accident in 2003 which caused him to have life-changing injuries: he couldn't put weight on his ankle and he severed nerves in his left arm.

At the 2016 Rio Paralympics, Brown took gold in the mixed coxed four alongside Pam Relph, Grace Clough, James Fox and Oliver James.

He was appointed Member of the Order of the British Empire (MBE) in the 2017 New Year Honours for services to rowing.

References

1982 births
Living people
Sportspeople from Reading, Berkshire
Paralympic rowers of Great Britain
Rowers at the 2016 Summer Paralympics
Medalists at the 2016 Summer Paralympics
Paralympic gold medalists for Great Britain